Göte Melin (26 July 1910 – 23 December 1991) was a Swedish wrestler. He competed in the men's freestyle lightweight at the 1936 Summer Olympics.

References

External links
 

1910 births
1991 deaths
Swedish male sport wrestlers
Olympic wrestlers of Sweden
Wrestlers at the 1936 Summer Olympics
People from Kristinehamn
Sportspeople from Värmland County
20th-century Swedish people